The Order of Merit (Distinguished service) first, second or third class, is the Ukrainian order of merit, given to individuals for outstanding achievements in economics, science, culture, military or political spheres of activity. It was first established by Ukrainian president Leonid Kuchma on September 22, 1996.

There are 3 grades, the highest being the first grade honours.

Those who are awarded the Order of Merit have the official title Chevalier of the Order of Merit.

The order can be granted posthumously.

The Honorary Award of the President of Ukraine
The Order of Merit originates from the Honorary Award of the President of Ukraine, the first decoration of independent Ukraine. The  Honorary Award was instituted by Ukrainian president Leonid Kravchuk on August 18, 1992. On September 22, 1996, it was  transformed into three classes of the Order of Merit. Recipients of the Honorary Award of the President of Ukraine are considered to be equal to the recipients of the Order of Merit and they are recognised as holders of the Order of Merit 3rd Class retaining the right to wear decorations that have been granted. Granting the Honorary Award of the President of Ukraine was discontinued following the institution of the Order of Merit.

Medals, star and ribbons of the Order of Merit
Awards to serving members of the armed forces bear crossed swords.

References

External links

 Laws of Ukraine «About the state awards of Ukraine» (Ukrainian)
 Order “For merits” 

 
Civil awards and decorations of Ukraine
Military awards and decorations of Ukraine
Awards established in 1996
1996 establishments in Ukraine
Orders of merit